Humshaugh is a parish near Hexham in Northumberland, England. The village had a population of 622 in the 2011 census, and is just north of Chollerford, which is located near Chesters Fort (Cilurnum) on Hadrian's Wall and is about 21 miles west of Newcastle upon Tyne. The village of Humshaugh lies just off the military road running from Newcastle to Carlisle which was built by General Wade during the 1745 Jacobite rebellion. Other nearby villages include Low Brunton and Walwick. Humshaugh is usually pronounced Humz-hoff, although some genuine locals have been heard calling it Humz-haff.

The paper mill near Humshaugh, on the River North Tyne close to Barrasford, among other mills in various rural locations around England, was used during the Napoleonic Wars to make the paper that was used to print fake French money in a bid to flood France with the forged notes, which was intended to cause a marked devaluation of the currency.

It is also attributed as the site of the first official Scout camp, held in August 1908, a year after the more famous experimental camp on Brownsea Island. Humshaugh was a large Parish, before sub division, and the Scouts took the train to Chollerford, the nearest station to Humshaugh, and walked up through Walwick and the woods to the site, which is known as Look Wide! The actual site is on land belonging to Park Shields Farm (grid reference NY 885 697), near to Fourstones, and is now marked by a cairn commemorating the event.

Etymology
The name is recorded in 1279 as "Hounshale" and seems to come from Anglo-Saxon Hūnes halh = "Hūn's nook of land".

Scouting

First official Scout camp 
While Brownsea Island was the site of the experimental camp run by Baden-Powell in 1907, Humshaugh hosted what is recognised as the first official Scout camp from 22 August to 4 September 1908. The difference between the two camps is that the 1907 event was not attended by any invested members of Scouting, since there was no movement at the time. The Humshaugh camp had 30 invested Boy Scouts from around the United Kingdom who were members of recognised Scout Troops who followed the Scout Method and Scout Law as developed by Baden-Powell and published in his Scouting for Boys.

Build-up 
The camp was advertised in the first issue of The Scout magazine in April 1908. The magazine asked the question "Who of you would want to spend a fortnight under canvas with a Troop of other boys, and under the care of General Baden-Powell?", which was met with great enthusiasm by the members of the fledgling movement. However, there was a catch – there were only thirty places available for Scouts on the camp, and they were to be selected by a voting system. Each issue of the magazine included a coupon which was to be sent back to the publisher with the name of a Scout being nominated to attend the camp.

This voting scheme was not the choice of Baden-Powell, but rather that of the magazine's publisher, C. Arthur Pearson, and many consider the idea to be a cynical marketing scheme designed to increase the sales of the magazine. Baden-Powell himself wrote "There is something in it which I fear will put off some readers of the better sort". However, this did not dampen the enthusiasm of the Scouts themselves. Lists were published in each issue, building up to the event, allowing Scouts to see who was in the top fifty nominees. When the voting had closed, the first placed Scout, F. D. Watson, had gained nominations from over 29,000 "friends".

Baden-Powell personally awarded the top fifty nominees a special edition "Scout" camera, along with a free copy of Scouting for Boys to the next fifty.

Participants 
The thirty nominated participants became known as the "Gallant Thirty". They were divided into five Patrols, and joined by a further six Scouts who were invited by Baden-Powell himself, including his own nephew, Donald Baden-Powell (who was also a participant of the Brownsea Island camp).

A number of adults also participated in the camp, many of whom were to become key figures in the Scout Movement in the years following the camp:
 Percy Everett – was an editor in the employ of Pearson, and also attended the Brownsea Island camp
 Victor Bridges – became Secretary of the Scout Movement in its early years
 W. B. Wakefield – one of the first two Scout Inspectors, and donated the land which was to become Great Tower Scout Camp
 Eric Sherbrooke Walker – the other of the first Scout Inspectors
 Henry Holt – became the Quartermaster of the Scout Movement, and started what became the Scout Shop
 Captain Dennis Colbron Pearse was Assistant Commandant. Late he was instrumental in the formation of the local Scouting committees which were to become the District and County organisations. In 1922 he moved to Tasmania, Australia, and was involved in Scouting there.
 J. L. C. Booth

It is also believed that there were two instructors from the United States, but very few details are known about these participants.

Programme 
The camp participants visited many local sites of interest, including Haughton Castle, Hexham Abbey, and Walwick Grange. They also spent time exploring the nearby stretches of Hadrian's Wall.

However, much of the programme was based around the gully in which the camp was sited, and saw many of the Scout games and Scoutcraft activities which Baden-Powell and his fellow instructors had developed for the Movement.

Centenary commemoration 

In August 2008 Jamboree 2008 was held at a campsite close to Carr Edge, and was attended by groups from the Baden-Powell Scouts' Association, a Scout group from Portugal and members of The Scout Association. This event included the several features of the original camp, including a visit to Hexham Abbey and other local attractions.

On 22 August these Scouts retraced Baden-Powell's route from the former Fourstones railway station to the Carr Edge site, where a commemorative service was held (pictured).

Scouting's Sunrise 
In 2007, Scouts from Ingleborough and Settle used the site to mark the centenary of the Scouting movement. They held a ceremony for Scouting's Sunrise on 1 August.

Governance
An electoral ward in the same name exists. This ward stretches north almost to Bellingham and south almost to Acomb with a total population taken at the 2011 census of 4,568.

Famous residents
Eric Boswell, composer of the Christmas song "Little Donkey" and many other popular and folk songs, lived in Humshaugh from 1985 to 2009 and often played organ for services at St Peter's Church.

Kevin Whately, actor famous for playing Lewis, grew up in Humshaugh.

See also

References

External links

 Northumberland Communities

Baden-Powell Scouts' Association
The Scout Association
Villages in Northumberland